Tetracha latreillei is a species of tiger beetle that was described by Laporte in 1834, and is found in Chile and Peru.

References

Beetles described in 1834
Beetles of South America
Cicindelidae